Genc Ibro (born 7 July 1967) is an Albanian retired footballer, who played as a defender for Dinamo Tirana football club.

International career
He made his debut for Albania in a September 1990 friendly match against Greece and earned a total of 3 caps, scoring no goals.

His final international was a December 1990 European Championship qualification match against Spain.

Defection
Ibro, alongside national team members Lorenc Leskaj and Eduard Kaçaçi, disappeared from the national team squad in March 1991 in Geneva on their way to Paris to play a European Championship qualifier against France. At the time, Albania was still ruled by the communists. The players were later reported to have sought asylum in Switzerland.

Honours
Albanian Superliga: 2
 1986, 1990

References

External links

1967 births
Living people
Association football defenders
Albanian footballers
Albania international footballers
FK Dinamo Tirana players
Kategoria Superiore players
Albanian defectors
Albanian expatriate footballers
Expatriate footballers in Italy
Albanian expatriate sportspeople in Italy